NA-256 Khuzdar is a constituency for the National Assembly of Pakistan.

Assembly Segments

Members of Parliament

2018-2022: NA-269 Khuzdar

Election 2002 

General elections were held on 10 Oct 2002. Abdur Rauf Mengal of Balochistan National Party won by 27,269 votes.

Election 2008 

General elections were held on 18 Feb 2008. Muhammad Usman Advocate an Independent candidate won by 27,609 votes.

Election 2013 

General elections were held on 11 May 2013. Mulana Qamar ud Din of JUI-F won by 24,795 and became the member of National Assembly.

Election 2018

General elections were held on 25 July 2018.

See also
NA-261 Sohbat Pur-cum-Jaffarabad-cum-Usta Muhammad
NA-257 Hub-cum-Lasbela-cum-Awaran

References

External links 
Election result's official website

NA-269